In 1912, the Chicago White Sox debuted one of the most enduring and famous logos in baseball – a large "S" in a Roman-style font, with a small "O" inside the top loop of the "S" and a small "X" inside the bottom loop.

History of SOX Logo
This logo was first used in 1912.

This is the logo associated with the 1917 World Series championship team, and the 1919 Black Sox. 

With a couple of brief interruptions, the dark blue logo with the large "S" lasted through 1938 (but continued in a modified block style into the 1940s).

Team Colors
Through the 1940s, the White Sox team colors were primarily navy blue trimmed with red.

Offseason 
 October 1911: Del Paddock was purchased by the White Sox from the Dubuque Hustlers.

Regular season

Season standings

Record vs. opponents

Notable transactions 
 April 26, 1912: Del Paddock was returned by the White Sox to the Dubuque Hustlers.
 August 20, 1912: Roy Crabb was purchased from the White Sox by the Philadelphia Athletics.

Roster

Player stats

Batting

Starters by position 
Note: Pos = Position; G = Games played; AB = At bats; H = Hits; Avg. = Batting average; HR = Home runs; RBI = Runs batted in

Other batters 
Note: G = Games played; AB = At bats; H = Hits; Avg. = Batting average; HR = Home runs; RBI = Runs batted in

Pitching

Starting pitchers 
Note: G = Games pitched; IP = Innings pitched; W = Wins; L = Losses; ERA = Earned run average; SO = Strikeouts

Other pitchers 
Note: G = Games pitched; IP = Innings pitched; W = Wins; L = Losses; ERA = Earned run average; SO = Strikeouts

Relief pitchers 
Note: G = Games pitched; W = Wins; L = Losses; SV = Saves; ERA = Earned run average; SO = Strikeouts

References

External links
1912 Chicago White Sox at Baseball Reference

Chicago White Sox seasons
Chicago White Sox season
Chicago White